Nithin Kumar Reddy (born 30 March 1983 ), known professionally as Nithiin, is an Indian actor and producer who primarily works in Telugu films. Nithiin made his acting debut with the romantic action film Jayam (2002), for which he received Filmfare Award for Best Male Debut – South and CineMAA Awards Best Male Debut. 

Nithiin then appeared in Dil (2003), Sye and Sri Anjaneyam, both (2004). He won Santosham Film Awards Best Young Performer for Sri Anjaneyam. After a series of commercial failures, Nithiin achieved success with the romance films Ishq (2012) and Gunde Jaari Gallanthayyinde (2013), receiving Filmfare Award for Best Actor – Telugu nominations for both these performances. He went onto establish himself with films including Heart Attack (2014), A Aa (2016) and Bheeshma (2020). He received SIIMA Award for Best Actor – Telugu nominations for the latter two.

Nithiin established his own film production studio, Shresht Movies in 2013. Nithiin is a brand ambassador for the Swachh Bharat campaign for the state of Telangana.

Early life and background
Nithin Kumar Reddy was born on 30 March 1983 to film distributor Sudhakar Reddy and Laxmi Reddy. He has an elder sister named Nikitha Reddy. He completed his education at Geetanjali School, Begumpet and did his intermediate education from Ratna Junior College and pursued his graduation at Shadan College of Engineering and Technology, Gandipet. His father later turned a producer and produced two movies with him, Gunde Jaari Gallanthayyinde and Chinnadana Nee Kosam. Nithin has added at extra "i" in his name and spells it as Nithiin.

Career

Debut and early success (2002-2004) 
Nithiin started his career with the movie Jayam in 2002, directed by Teja. Director Teja saw him at Sudarshan 35 mm theatre at a screening of his film Nuvvu Nenu on two occasions, Teja then enquired him about his acting interest and did a screen test and photo session and selected him as the lead for his directorial and production venture Jayam, also starring Sadha and Gopichand. In 2003, Nithiin acted in the film Dil, directed by V. V. Vinayak. produced by Dil Raju. Later in the same year, Nithiin acted in the film Sambaram, directed by Dasarath. K. In 2004, Nithiin starred in Sri Anjaneyam, directed by Krishna Vamsi, where he played the role as a devotee of Lord Hanuman. This is also the first film where Nithiin dubbed his dialogues, who until then was voiced by Sivaji.

Consecutive failures (2005-2011) 
Following his 2004 film Sye, directed by S. S. Rajamouli, Nithin appeared in a number of films, some of which are Dhairyam, Agyaat and Seeta Ramula Kalyanam. However, none of these films were commercially successful. Nithiin also has the distinction of most consecutive flops (12) by any actor in Telugu cinema. He tasted success after many years with 2012 Vikram Kumar-directed romantic drama film Ishq.

Comeback and stardom (2012-2016) 
In Ishq, Nithiin paired opposite Nithya Menen, which was also co-produced by his father Sudhakar Reddy. He acted in the film Gunde Jaari Gallanthayyinde in 2013. Isha Talwar and Nithya Menen played the lead roles along with Nithiin. Later, he acted in Chinnadana Nee Kosam, a film written and directed by A. Karunakaran in 2014, also produced by N. Sudhakar Reddy and sister Nikhita Reddy under their home banner Sresht Movies. Later the year, he played the lead in Heart Attack, directed by Puri Jagannadh. He made the role of a hippie and the movie got a mixed reviews. He acted in the role of a courier boy in the movie Courier Boy Kalyan, released in 2015, directed by Premsai and produced by Gautham Vasudev Menon. Nithiin acted in the film A Aa (2016), written and directed by Trivikram Srinivas, opposite Samantha Ruth Prabhu and Anupama Parameswaran. The film became the biggest grosser in Nithin's career.

Recent work and further career (2017−present) 
In 2017, Nithiin acted in the film LIE which was directed by Hanu Raghavapudi. It garnered average reviews from critics and could not perform well at the box office. In 2018, Nithiin's Chal Mohan Ranga directed by Krishna Chaitanya with co-star Megha Akash. The film performed poorly at the box office.  Later the year, he starred in Srinivasa Kalyanam opposite Raashi Khanna and directed by Satish Vegesna. His 2020 film Bheeshma, directed by Venky Kudumula and starring alongside Rashmika Mandanna was a commercial success.

Nithiin collaborated with director Chandra Sekhar Yeleti for Check (2021), co-starring Rakul Preet Singh and Priya Prakash Varrier. His second release of the year was Rang De, directed by Venky Atluri and starred alongside Keerthy Suresh. His third release of the year was the black comedy crime thriller Maestro which had a direct-to-streaming release on Disney+ Hotstar on 17 September 2021. He played the role of a pianist, with critics praising his performance in the film and this is remake of Hindi film Andhadhun. In September 2021, he started filming was for his next film Macherla Niyojakavargam.

Personal life
In 2020, Nithiin married his girlfriend Shalini Kandukuri. Their wedding took place at Falaknuma Palace, Hyderabad.

Filmography

As actor

All films are in Telugu, unless otherwise noted.

As producer

Discography

Awards and nominations

References

External links
 
 
 

Living people
Indian Hindus
Filmfare Awards South winners
Male actors from Hyderabad, India
Telugu film producers
Indian male film actors
Telugu male actors
Male actors in Hindi cinema
People from Nizamabad, Telangana
Film producers from Hyderabad, India
21st-century Indian male actors
1983 births
Santosham Film Awards winners